The Tagebau Garzweiler is a surface mine in the German state of North Rhine-Westphalia. It is operated by RWE and used for mining lignite. The community was moved to a section of Jüchen with the same name.

The open-pit mine 

The mine is located west of Grevenbroich and exploitation is progressing towards Erkelenz. Mining was originally limited to the  Garzweiler I area located east of the A 44 motorway. Mining in the  Garzweiler II area started in 2006 and it will take until around 2045 to fully exploit both sectors. The lignite is used for power generation at nearby power plants such as Neurath and Niederaußem.

It is not yet known what effect the plan to phase out all coal-fired power plants in Germany by 2038 will have on the Garzweiler lignite mine system.

Traffic 
The A 44 and A 61 motorways that crossed the planned mine area were also affected. The A 44 was closed in 2005, dismantled in 2006 and traffic rerouted to the widened A 61 and A 46 motorways. In 2017, as the mine expanded to the west, the A 61 was closed with traffic diverted onto a stretch of newly built A 44 to the east of its original route.

Displacement of people 
In the early 1980s, it is estimated that more than 30,000 people had to be moved for the Garzweiler mine. These people had to leave their houses and move. Plans for Garzweiler II required that 12 more towns would have to be removed, with around 12,000 more people relocated. This has caused many controversies where people protested to save their homes.

See also 

 Church of St. Lambertus, Immerath
 
 
 Lützerath
 
 
 
 
 
  ("Street of energy")
 Ende Gelände 2015
 Ende Gelände 2019
 
 Hambach open pit mine
 
 
 
 Commission on Growth, Structural Change and Employment

References

External links

 Information on Tagebau Garzweiler on the RWE website (German)

Coal mines in Germany
Geography of North Rhine-Westphalia
Open-pit mines
RWE